Pingjiang County is a county in the northeast of Hunan province, China. It is the easternmost county-level division of the prefecture-level city of Yueyang.

The county is located on the eastern margin of the province, the Miluo River runs through the county from east to west. It is bordered to the north by Yueyang County, to the west by Miluo City, to the south by Changsha County and Liuyang City, to the east by Xiushui and Tonggu Counties of Jiangxi, to the northeast by Tongcheng County of Hubei.

The county has 19 towns and 5 townships under its jurisdiction. The government seat is Hanchang Town.

History
In the Chinese Civil War, Pingjiang was a part of the Hunan-Hubei-Jiangxi Revolutionary Base Area, and, from 1931 November, of the Hunan-Hubei-Jiangxi Soviet.

The Communist Marshal Peng Dehuai was a Kuomintang Colonel in 1928, when he was stationed in Pingjiang with orders to eliminate local groups of communist guerrillas who had fled to the area following Chiang Kai-shek's nationwide suppression of Communists. Because Peng had secretly joined the Chinese Communist Party he instead kept his unit passive and began to organize local Communist Party branches. Peng rebelled against the Kuomintang on 28 July 1928, beginning his career as a military leader in the Red Army from his base in Pingjiang. Some of Peng's subordinates in the rebellion survived and became important military figures themselves, including generals Huang Kecheng and Peng Shaohui.

Administrative divisions
According to the result on adjustment of township-level administrative divisions of Pingjiang County on 24 November 2015, Pingjiang has 5 townships and 19 towns under its jurisdiction, they are:

5 townships
 Banjiang
 Dazhou, Pingjiang
 Mujin, Pingjiang
 Sandun
 Sanyang

19 towns
 Anding, Pingjiang
 Cenchuan
 Changshou, Pingjiang
 Fushoushan
 Hanchang Town
 Hongqiao, Pingjiang
 Jiayi, Pingjiang
 Longmen, Pingjiang
 Meixian, Pingjiang
 Nanjiang, Pingjiang (Nankiang)
 Sanshi
 Shangtashi
 Tongshi
 Wengjiang
 Wukou
 Wushi, Pingjiang
 Xiangjia
 Niushizhai
 Yuping, Pingjiang

Climate

Notes and references

External links

 
County-level divisions of Hunan
Yueyang